This is the filmography of Joseph "Erap" Estrada, Filipino actor and 13th President of the Philippines. His film career spans 33 years, from 1956 to 1989. He played the lead role in more than 100 movies, and was producer of over 70 films. He was the first FAMAS Hall of Fame awardee for Best Actor (1981) and also became a Hall of Fame award-winner as a producer (1983).

He often played heroes of the downtrodden classes, which gained him the admiration of a lot of the nation's many unschooled and impoverished citizens. This later proved advantageous to his political career. In 1974, he founded the Movie Workers Welfare Foundation (Mowelfund) which helps movie makers through medical reimbursements, hospitalization, surgery and death benefits, livelihood, and alternative income opportunities and housing. Its educational arm, the Mowelfund Film Institute, has produced some of the most skilled and respected producers, filmmakers, writers and performers in both the independent and mainstream sectors of the industry since its inception in 1979. He also founded, together with Dr. Guillermo De Vega, the first Metro Manila Film Festival in 1975.  Erap returned to the big screen in 2009 in Ang Tanging Pamilya: A Marry Go Round, his comeback movie after a 20-year hiatus.

Filmography

Films

References

External links

Philippine filmographies
Male actor filmographies